The median-striped ctenotus (Ctenotus mesotes)  is a species of skink found in Western Australia.

References

mesotes
Reptiles described in 2009
Taxa named by Paul Horner (herpetologist)